Walter Ellis (born September 7, 1948) is a Northern Ireland-born, United States-based writer. He spends his summers in France.

Ellis is the author of The Beginning of the End: The Crippling Disadvantage of a Happy Irish Childhood, the story of his early life in Belfast, Durham, Cork, and Brussels, and his uneasy relationship with his cousin, Ronnie Bunting, a leading member of the Irish National Liberation Army, shot dead in 1980. He also wrote The Oxbridge Conspiracy: How the Ancient Universities Have Kept Their Stranglehold on the Establishment (/), a study of elitism in higher education in England.

He has lived in New York since 2001. His wife Louisa is a graphic designer and painter. His son, Jamie Ellis, is a record producer.

Walter Ellis, formerly a journalist and foreign correspondent for several British and Irish newspapers, now writes obituaries for The Times of London. He is also moving into the field of fiction. His thriller, The Fleeing Man, was published in Italy in 2010 (as Il Codice Caravaggio) and came out in Ireland in the summer of 2012, achieving excellent reviews.

References

Ellis, W. (2006). The Beginning of the End:  the Crippling Disadvantage of a Happy Irish Childhood.  Edinburgh:  Mainstream Press.

External links  

1948 births
Living people
Journalists from Northern Ireland
Male non-fiction writers from Northern Ireland
Writers from Belfast
Writers from New York City
21st-century writers from Northern Ireland
21st-century non-fiction writers from Northern Ireland